Georgiana Alina Birțoiu is a Romanian international football striker currently playing for WFC Rossiyanka in the Russian league. She previously played for Clujana, with which she played the UEFA Women's Cup, and Kokkinichorion in the Cypriot league, where she was the 2010–11 season's second top scorer with 27 goals.

She played her first minutes for the Romanian national team in the 2011 World Cup qualification.

References

1989 births
Living people
Romanian women's footballers
Romania women's international footballers
Expatriate women's footballers in Russia
WFC Rossiyanka players
Sportspeople from Cluj-Napoca
Women's association football forwards
CFF Clujana players